Nicon House is an office building at 45 Silver Street, Enfield, London, that until 1911 was the Church of England Girls' School of Industry. It was then used as a boys' preparatory school and subsequently, until 1984, as the offices and printing works of the Enfield Gazette.

References

External links 

Enfield, London
Buildings and structures in the London Borough of Enfield
Church of England schools
Office buildings in London